Kurya is a rural locality (a village) in Vorobyovskoye Rural Settlement, Sokolsky District, Vologda Oblast, Russia. The population was 6 in 2002.

Geography 
Rogozkino is the nearest rural locality.

References 

Rural localities in Sokolsky District, Vologda Oblast